North Guhuan Island is a Malaysian island located in the Sulu Sea near Banggi Island on the state of Sabah. It is one of the extreme points of Malaysia.

See also
 List of islands of Malaysia

References

External links 
 Guhuan Utara Island Weather

Islands of Sabah